is a 2021 Japanese animated science fantasy film written and directed by Mamoru Hosoda and produced by Studio Chizu. The story is inspired by the 1756 French fairy tale Beauty and the Beast by Jeanne-Marie Leprince de Beaumont as well as the 1991 Disney animated film.

Belle premiered on July 15, 2021, at the 2021 Cannes Film Festival, where it was well-received by critics with a standing ovation that lasted fourteen minutes. The film was additionally dubbed into foreign languages (English, Portuguese Spanish, Italian, French and German). It was released theatrically in Japan on July 16, 2021. GKIDS has licensed the film in North America, with a nationwide release date of January 14, 2022, and previews in select IMAX theaters on January 12, while Anime Limited released the film in the United Kingdom on February 4, 2022.

Plot

Teenager Suzu Naito lives in the rural Kōchi Prefecture of Japan with a lost passion for singing and writing songs. When Suzu was young, she witnessed her mother rescue a child from a flooding river at the cost of her own life, causing her to resent her mother for "abandoning" her for a stranger's child and eventually grow distant from her father. She remains in contact with a group of older choir teachers who were her mother's friends. She is alienated from most of her classmates, with the exception of her childhood friend and self-appointed protector Shinobu Hisatake, on whom she has a crush; popular girl Ruka Watanabe; sportsman classmate Shinjiro “Kamishin” Chikami; and her genius best friend Hiroka "Hiro" Betsuyaku.

Urged by Hiro, Suzu signs into the popular virtual metaverse "U" and is appointed a beautiful avatar with freckles (through the AI engine's biometric analysis) whom she names "Bell", the English translation of her own name. Upon logging into U, she finds herself capable of singing again. With the assistance of Hiro, who has appointed herself Bell's manager and producer, Bell almost immediately becomes a best-seller on U's music charts, and people start to refer to her as "Belle", meaning "beautiful" in French.

During one of Belle's concerts, an infamously strong and near-unbeatable user called "The Dragon" (or "The Beast") arrives, fleeing from the Justices, a vigilante group led by the self-righteous Justin, who begin fighting the Dragon and accusing him of disturbing the peace of U. Justin plans to unveil the Dragon's identity to the public using a specialized program mostly reserved for U's owners. Intrigued by the Dragon, Suzu begins to gather information about him. She discovers that he is popular amongst children, who consider him to be their hero, particularly an 8th grader named Tomo who was in the news following his mother's death. Belle searches U for the Dragon and is led to the Dragon's hidden castle by a mysterious angel avatar. She meets the Dragon and his five guardian AIs. Belle and the Dragon grow close. In the real world, Ruka confides to Suzu that she likes Kamishin. With Suzu's help, the two confess their feelings, after a long period of awkward embarrassment.

In U, Justin captures and interrogates Belle, threatening to unveil her identity to the world if she refuses to cooperate. The Dragon's AIs rescue Belle but their intervention allows Justin and his group to locate the Dragon's castle and set it on fire, destroying it. The Dragon flees before Belle can find him and flee with him. Suzu and Hiro work to find out the Dragon's real identity before Justin can and warn him. They find a live video feed of Tomo singing a song only Belle and the Dragon know, and realize that Tomo is the angel avatar, and his older brother Kei is the Dragon. Kei and Tomo are being physically and mentally abused by their father; Kei's anger and protectiveness over Tomo is what gives The Dragon his unbeatable strength in U. Suzu contacts Kei to try and help, but Kei does not believe that she is Belle, and generally distrusts everyone offering to help, since no help has ever arrived. Shinobu, Ruka, Kamishin, and the choir teachers reveal their knowledge of Belle's true identity and urge Suzu to sing to gain Kei's trust. Suzu unveils herself to the world in U and sings. Seeing this, Kei decides to trust her and tries to contact her again. Kei's father sees the video of his abuse posted online and cuts off the internet connection before Kei can tell Suzu their address.

Using context clues, Ruka and Kamishin deduce that Kei's hometown is Kawasaki, Kanagawa, near Tokyo. Since the authorities cannot intervene on abuse charges until 48 hours have passed, Suzu locates Kei and Tomo on her own and protects them from their father. The next day, she and her father warmly greet each other at the station. Shinobu praises Suzu for her bravery and decides she no longer needs his protection, feeling free to pursue the friendship he has always wanted with her. Finally understanding her mother's selfless actions, Suzu comes to terms with her mother's death, and is ready to open up to life.

Voice cast

Production
While Studio Chizu worked on the project, they had help from veteran Disney animator and character designer Jin Kim and Michael Camacho on the design of Belle and studio Cartoon Saloon for the background work of the world of U.

Hosoda initially intended for Belle to be a musical, but considered the idea difficult due to Japan not having a culture of making musicals. However, he still wanted music to be central to the film, so he searched for a protagonist that could sing. He stated that he preferred the same person doing both speaking and singing voices to make it convincing, and searched for a singer who could express their feelings though song and move people, even if they don't understand Japanese. He then found Kaho Nakamura, whom he considered relatively unknown, but a perfect choice for the role. Hosoda stated that Nakamura was also involved in writing lyrics, so she could feel the lyrics she was singing.

Soundtrack

Track listing

Release
The film was released originally in July 2021, but was later given special premieres and limited theatrical runs from late 2021 to early 2023. This list details the cinematic release dates:
Japan
 July 16, 2021
North America
 January 12, 2022 (limited)
 January 14, 2022 (nationwide)
International
 September 29, 2021 - South Korea
 October 8, 2021 - Taiwan
 October 28, 2021 - Hong Kong
 November 18, 2021 - Singapore
 December 29, 2021 - France
 January 6, 2022 - Malaysia
 January 12, 2022 - Indonesia
 January 13, 2022 - Peru
 January 14, 2022 - Canada and Turkey
 January 20, 2022 - Argentina, Australia (internet), Chile (limited), Mexico & Uruguay
 February 4, 2022 - United Kingdom and Ireland
 February 10, 2022 - UAE, Bahrain, Kuwait, Oman & Saudi Arabia
 February 17, 2022 - Hungary 
 February 18, 2022 - Finland
 March 17, 2022 - Italy and Portugal
 March 25, 2022 - Andorra and Spain 
 April 1, 2022 - Poland 
 April 14, 2022 - Kazakhstan and Russia
 April 22, 2022 - Estonia
 May 26, 2022 - Netherlands
 June 9, 2022 - Germany
 July 29, 2022 - Sweden
 August 26, 2022 - China
 November 10, 2022 - Denmark 
 January 26, 2023 - Greece

Reception

Box office

In the film's U.S. opening weekend it made $1.6 million from 1,326 theaters, and a total of $1.8 million over the four-day Martin Luther King Day holiday frame. The film dropped out of the box office top ten in its second weekend with $570,213. The film was released on May 17, 2022 on DVD & Blu-ray by GKids (through its distribution partner Shout! Factory).

Critical response
  American audiences polled by PostTrak gave the film an 86% positive score, with 63% saying they would definitely recommend it.

At the 2021 Cannes Film Festival, the film received a 14-minute-standing ovation. Joe Morgenstern wrote for The Wall Street Journal that "There's too much plot for the film to manage, but its heart, and sumptuous art, are so firmly in the right place that its appeal comes through sweet and clear." Manohla Dargis of The New York Times praised the visual quality, character development, worldbuilding, and called the film "unfailingly touching." Justin Chang of the Los Angeles Times praised the visuals and story, writing "It’s a tale as old as time and as newfangled as TikTok, in which the virtual world, though packed with fantasy and artifice, can bring startling truths to the surface."

Accolades
The film has received five Annie Award nominations, including one for Best Independent Animated Feature. Its total makes it the most nominations for a Japanese anime film ever at the awards, surpassing previous films Spirited Away, Millennium Actress (both 2001), and Weathering with You (2019) with four.

References

External links
  
 
 

2020s Japanese-language films
2020s teen films
2020s teen drama films
2020s teen fantasy films
2021 anime films
2021 computer-animated films
2021 science fiction films
Animated musical films
Animated films about friendship
Animated science fantasy films
Anime with original screenplays
Films about child abuse
Films about domestic violence
Films about social media
Films about technological impact
Films about technology
Films about the Internet
Films about virtual reality
Films based on Beauty and the Beast
Films directed by Mamoru Hosoda
Films set in Kanagawa Prefecture
Films set in Kōchi Prefecture
IMAX films
Japanese animated science fiction films
Japanese animated fantasy films
Japanese science fantasy films
Japanese high school films
Japanese musical drama films
Japanese musical fantasy films
Japanese science fiction films
Japanese teen drama films
Middle school films
Nippon TV films
Science fantasy films
Science fiction musical films
Toho animated films
Yen Press titles